Geneva Armory is a historic National Guard armory building located at Geneva in Ontario County, New York. The armory consists of a long, shallow, rectangular, five-story, hip-roofed administration building with an attached -story, rectangular gable-roofed drill shed.  The original section of the administration building was built in 1892 and designed by architect Isaac G. Perry. It was tripled in size in 1906 and the addition included a slightly off-center 10-sided, -story castle-like tower.

It was listed on the National Register of Historic Places in 1995.

References

Armories on the National Register of Historic Places in New York (state)
Government buildings completed in 1892
Infrastructure completed in 1892
Buildings and structures in Ontario County, New York
Geneva, New York
National Register of Historic Places in Ontario County, New York